Charontidae is a family of whip spiders.

Genera
Catageus Thorell, 1889 (9 species)
Charon Karsch, 1879 (5 species)

References
 Biolib

Amblypygi
Arachnid families